The 2005–06 Taça de Portugal was the 66th edition of the Portuguese football knockout tournament, organized by the Portuguese Football Federation (FPF). The 2005–06 Taça de Portugal began on 4 September 2005. The final was played on 14 May 2006 at the Estádio Nacional.

Vitória de Setúbal were the previous holders, having defeated Benfica 2–1, in the previous season's final. However, Vitória de Setúbal was not able to regain their title as they were defeated in the final by Porto. Porto defeated Vitória de Setúbal, 1–0 to win their fourth title in seven seasons and claim their 13th Taça de Portugal in their history.

Since Porto had already qualified for the 2006–07 UEFA Champions League as domestic title holders, Vitória by reaching the final of the Taça de Portugal, had guaranteed a place in the 2006–07 UEFA Cup. As Porto won both the league and cup in the same season, Vitória would qualify for the 2006 Supertaça Cândido de Oliveira as the cup runner-up.

Format and schedule

 Fifty two of the fifty eight teams who participated in the 2005–06 Segunda Divisão, played in this round. Benfica B, Braga B, Marítimo B, Porto B and Vitória de Setúbal B were unable to compete in the domestic cup competition due to the possibility of encountering their senior side in the competition. Queluz also did not participate.

Teams

Primeira Liga 

 Académica de Coimbra
 Belenenses
 Benfica
 Boavista
 Estrela da Amadora
 Porto
 Gil Vicente
 Marítimo
 Nacional

 Naval
 Paços de Ferreira
 Penafiel
 Rio Ave
 SC Braga
 Sporting CP
 União de Leiria
 Vitória de Guimarães
 Vitória de Setúbal

Liga de Honra 

 Barreirense
 Beira-Mar
 Chaves
 Desportivo das Aves
 Estoril
 Feirense
 Gondomar
 Leixões
 Maia

 Marco
 Moreirense
 Olhanense
 Ovarense
 Portimonense
 Santa Clara
 Sporting da Covilhã
 Varzim
 Vizela

Second Division 

Série A

 Camacha
 Fafe
 Famalicão
 Freamunde
 Lixa
 Os Sandinenses
 Portosantense

 Ribeirão
 Trofense
 União da Madeira
 União Torcatense
 Valdevez
 Vilaverdense

Série B

 Aliados Lordelo
 Dragões Sandinenses
 Esmoriz
 Fiães
 Infesta
 Lousada

 Paredes
 Pedras Rubras
 Pontassolense
 Ribeira Brava
 Sanjoanense
 Sporting de Espinho

Série C

 Abrantes
 Benfica Castelo Branco
 Fátima
 Nelas
 Oliveira do Bairro
 Oliveira do Hospital
 Oliveirense

 Pampilhosa
 Portomosense
 Penalva do Castelo
 Rio Maior
 Sporting de Pombal
 Tourizense
 União de Coimbra

Série D

 Casa Pia
 Imortal
 Louletano
 Madalena
 Mafra
 Odivelas
 Olivais e Moscavide

 Operário
 Oriental
 Pinhalnovense
 Silves
 Torreense
 União Micaelense

Third Division 
Série A

 AD Oliveirense
 Amares
 Bragança
 Brito
 Cabeceirense
 Cerveira
 Correlhã
 Esposende
 Joane

 Maria da Fonte
 Merelinense
 Monção
 Mondinense
 Mirandela
 Valenciano
 Valpaços
 Vianense
 Vinhais

Série B

 Ataense
 Canedo
 Cinfães
 Ermesinde
 Leça
 Lourosa
 Moncorvo
 Padroense
 Rebordosa

 Rio Tinto
 São Pedro da Cova
 Tarouquense
 Tirsense
 UD Valonguense
 Vila Meã
 Vila Real
 Vilanovense

Série C

 AD Valonguense
 Anadia
 Arrifanense
 Avanca
 Cesarense
 Estarreja
 Fornos de Algodres
 Gafanha
 Marialvas

 Milheiroense
 São João de Ver
 Sátão
 Social Lamas
 Souropires
 Tocha
 Tondela
 União de Lamas
 Valecambrense

Série D

 Alcobaça
 Amiense
 Atlético Riachense
 Beneditense
 Bidoeirense
 Caldas
 Caranguejeira
 Eléctrico
 Fundão

 Idanhense
 Marinhense
 Mirandense
 Monsanto
 Peniche
 Sertanense
 Sourense
 Vigor Mocidade

Série E

 1º de Dezembro
 Alcochetense
 Atlético CP
 Atlético do Cacém
 Câmara de Lobos
 Caniçal
 Carregado
 CF Benfica
 Loures

 Machico
 Montijo
 O Elvas
 Ouriquense
 Santana
 Sintrense
 União de Tires
 Vialonga
 Vilafranquense

Série F

 Aljustrelense
 Almancilense
 Amora
 Beira-Mar de Monte Gordo
 Castrense
 CF Vasco da Gama
 Desportivo de Beja
 Estrela de Vendas Novas
 Ferreiras

 Juventude Évora
 Lagoa
 Lusitano de Évora
 Lusitano VRSA
 Messinense
 Monte Trigo
 Oeiras
 Sesimbra

Série Azores

 Angrense
 Boavista Flores
 Lusitânia
 Marítimo Graciosa
 Praiense

 Rabo de Peixe
 Santiago
 Santo António
 Velense
 Vitória do Pico

District Leagues

 Águia dos Arrifes
 Amarante
 Barreiro
 Coruchense
 Escalos de Baixo
 Esperança de Lagos
 Flamengos
 Lusitano de Viseu
 Macedo de Cavaleiros
 Marinhas
 Milieu Guarda

 União Nogueirense
 Paços de Brandão
 Ponterrolense
 Santa Eulália
 Santacruzense
 Sarilhense
 Távora
 União da Serra
 União Montemor
 Vasco da Gama AC

First round
For the first round draw, teams were drawn against each other in accordance to their geographical location. The draw was split up into four sections: teams from the north, the center, the south and the Azores region. Ties were played on 4 September. In the first round, three sides forfeited their respective matches thus allowing their opponents to proceed to the next round. The first round of the cup saw teams from the Terceira Divisão (IV) start the competition alongside some teams who registered to participate in the cup from the Portuguese District Leagues (V).

North Zone

|}

Central Zone

|}

South Zone

|}

Azores Zone

|}

Second round
The second round ties were played on 18 September. Maria da Fonte's cup tie against Felgueiras, saw Felgueiras forfeit the match with the Portuguese Football Federation awarding the victory to Maria da Fonte. The second round saw teams from the Portuguese Second Division (III) enter the competition.

|}

Third round
The draw for the third round took place on 22 September. Most of the third round ties were played on 5 October. The cup ties involving Imortal and Freamunde, Nelas and Moreirense and Oliveirense and Esmoriz were played on 8 October. Due to the odd number of games in the third round, Pontassolense progressed to the next round due to having no opponent to face at this stage of the competition. The third round saw teams from the Liga de Honra (II) enter the competition.

|}

Fourth round
The draw for the fourth round took place on 10 October.  The majority of games were played on 26 October. Parades's cup tie against Nelas was played on 30 October whilst the ties involving Paços de Ferreira and Tourizense, and Naval and Pontassolense were played on 12–13 November. Due to the odd number of games in the third round, Vitória de Guimarães progressed to the next round due to having no opponent to face at this stage of the competition. The fourth round, saw teams from the Primeira Liga (I) enter the competition.

|}

Fifth round
The draw for the fifth round took place on 17 November. The fifth round ties were all played on 11 January.

Sixth round
Ties were played on 8 February. Due to the odd number of games in the sixth round, Porto progressed to the quarter-finals due to having no opponent to face at this stage of the competition.

Quarter-finals
Ties were played on 15 March. All eight quarter-finalists were from the Primeira Liga.

Semi-finals
Ties were played on 22–23 March. All four semi-finalists were from the Primeira Liga.

Final

References

Taça de Portugal seasons
Taca De Portugal, 2005-06
2005–06 domestic association football cups